Edith! is a historical fiction podcast produced by QCode and Crooked Media starring Rosamund Pike about Edith Wilson.

Background 
The podcast is a collaboration between QCode and Crooked Media. The podcast takes places soon after the Treaty of Versailles and the Spanish flu when Woodrow Wilson fell ill while working to establish the League of Nations. The podcast follows Edith Wilson who took over much of her husband's responsibilities while he was struggling with his health. Rosamund Pike stars as Edith Wilson in the podcast. Other voice actors included Clark Gregg and Stephen Root. The story is based on historical events, but the show is a dramatization of the events and does not aim for historical accuracy which is evident by the subtitle—"The Untold True-ish Story of America's Secret First Female President". The podcast was an eight episode series.

Reception 
Nicholas Quah wrote in Vulture that the podcast is "too eagerly and cavalierly clever for its own good". Ammar Kalia wrote in The Guardian that the podcast "is a wry take on the historical machinations of power." Podcast Review, a channel of Los Angeles Review of Books, called the podcast "Quirky, stylish, and probably historically inaccurate". Patricia Nicol praised Pike's acting in The Times saying that she "is superb as the snarky, steely, manoeuvring Edith, always two steps ahead of the men"

Awards

References 

Audio podcasts
2021 podcast debuts
2021 podcast endings
Historical fiction podcasts
Scripted podcasts
American podcasts
Crooked Media